Lagwan (Logone) is a Chadic language spoken in northern Cameroon and southwestern Chad. Dialects include Logone-Birni and Logone-Gana.

Lagwan is spoken in the northern part of Logone-Birni, from the banks of the Logone River to the Nigerian border (Logone-et-Chari Department, Far North Region). It is also spoken in Chad and Nigeria. It has 38,500 speakers in Cameroon.

Phonology 

As is common in Chadic languages, the principal vowel is the low central vowel /a/; where there is no underlying V-slot, an epenthetic ‘zero vowel’ is inserted. Despite the limited distribution of the other vowels, /i, u, e, o/ have emerging phonological status. However, as has been observed in other Chadic languages, certain contrasts are productive only word-finally, excluding the sub-lexicon of loan words.

Lagwan has two contrastive tones, low and high. Mid tone is also found on a few nouns loaned from Classical Arabic. On intensifiers the phonological high tone has an extra-high realisation.

Notes

References 
 Johannes Lukas.  1936.  Die Logone-Sprache im Zentralen Sudan.  Leipzig:  DMG.
 Joy Naomi Ruff.  2005.  Phonology of Lagwan.  Cameroon.

Biu-Mandara languages
Languages of Cameroon
Languages of Chad